Awaba is a town and locality in the City of Lake Macquarie, Greater Newcastle in New South Wales, Australia, inland from Toronto. The name Awaba is of Aboriginal origins, and means "flat or plain surface", referring to Lake Macquarie.

History and facilities
The Aboriginal people, in this area, the Awabakal, were the first people of this land.

Name Origin:
Aboriginal word meaning flat or plain surface, which was the aboriginal term for Lake Macquarie.

Early Land Grants:
Mr. W.A. Kingscote held a 1,100 acre property, Parish of Awaba.

Early Subdivisions:
Crown Subdivision, first plan approved 20 August 1891. There were no street names in the first subdivision. The first street plans in 1892, consisted of Barton St, Melbourne St, Brisbane St, Gosford St, Nellinda St, Heaton St and Adelaide St.

Early Settlers:
The timber workers were the area's pioneers and most came from Mulbring, Brunkerville, Mount Vincent and Wallis Plains. They included the Field, Wellard, Puddy and Murrell families.

Early Industries:
In 1885 a timber depot was established. In the same year Awaba was selected as a site for a railway construction depot. A large saw mill was an early feature of the town. In 1948 the Awaba State Coal Mine was established, largely through the efforts of J.M. Baddeley, who had been the wartime Minister for Mines.

Railway:
At the outset in 1887 Awaba had a platform on the down side of the line, with a loop siding opposite. Awaba to Wangi Wangi Power Station branch line opened on 25 May 1954. It was 6.5 miles long, but is now disused.

First Post Office:
Opened 1 October 1889.

First School:
Public school opened in June 1891.

Town:
The village developed in response to the needs of the railway contractors and homes were scattered over a wide area. One settler operated a small general store, another a primitive butcher's shop.

A timber depot was established there in 1885, and the township created the same year. The railway station was opened in 1887.

References

External links
 History of Awaba

Suburbs of Lake Macquarie
Towns in New South Wales